The 2021 Pendle Borough Council election took place on 6 May 2021 to elect all members of Pendle Borough Council in England. This was on the same day as other English local elections. All 33 seats across 12 wards were up for election due to boundary changes.

The elections resulted in the Conservatives gaining overall control.

Results

Council composition
Following the last election in 2017, the composition of the 48-seat council was:

After the election, the composition of the 33-seat council was:

I - Independent

Ward results
Incumbent councillors are denoted by an asterisk (*). Sources -

Barnoldswick

Barrowford and Pendleside

Boulsworth and Foulridge

Bradley

Brierfield East and Clover Hill

Brierfield West and Reedley

Earby and Coates

Fence and Higham

Marsden and Southfield

Vivary Bridge

Waterside and Horsfield

Whitefield and Walverden

References

2021
2020s in Lancashire
Pendle
May 2021 events in the United Kingdom